The Lethal Legion is the name of seven teams of fictional characters appearing in American comic books published by Marvel Comics.

Publication history
The first version of the Lethal Legion appeared in The Avengers #78 (Jul. 1970).

The second version of the Lethal Legion appeared in Avengers #164 (Oct. 1977)

The third version in West Coast Avengers vol. 2, #1 (Oct. 1985).

The fourth version appeared in Marvel Age Annual #1 (1985).

The fifth version of the Lethal Legion appeared in Avengers West Coast #98 (Sep. 1993)

The sixth version of the Lethal Legion appeared in the limited series Dark Reign: Lethal Legion #1 (Aug. 2009).

History

Grim Reaper's Lethal Legion

The original Lethal Legion are formed by the villain Grim Reaper (the brother of Avenger Wonder Man) and consisted of Man-Ape, Power Man, Living Laser, and Swordsman. Man-Ape attacks Captain America, but is beaten back by the Avengers. However, he captures the Black Panther's girlfriend Monica binding her hand and foot with metal clamps. Black Panther is lured into a trap by Man-Ape, and despite getting past him he is knocked out by an exploding dummy of Monica. Black Panther is chained and with Man-Ape, he meets the other members of the Lethal Legion.

Grim Reaper dispatched the Lethal Legion members to different locations to meet the Avengers. Power Man and Swordsman were sent to the water main below Avengers Mansion, Living Laser and Man-Ape were sent to the nearby power station, and Grim Reaper seemingly departed to Greenwich Village. Black Panther broke free and contacted the Avengers to warn them about the Lethal Legion's plot. Grim Reaper returns and uses the knockout gas in his scythe to knock out Black Panther while revealing that he planned to have the Avengers lured to the locations of which Black Panther knew about. While the other members of the Lethal Legion defeat the different Avengers, Vision defeats Power Man (who had been sent to capture him at Avengers Mansion). He disguises himself as Power Man and Power Man as him and takes him to the base. The Lethal Legion places the Avengers in an hourglass container and then fills it with deadly gas. When "Power Man" arrived with "Vision," Grim Reaper detected the brain patterns of Wonder Man and shattered the hourglass to save Vision's life only to realize that the vision in the hourglass was actually Power Man. At that point, Vision aided the Avengers into defeating the Lethal Legion who are handed over to the authorities.

Count Nefaria's Lethal Legion

A second version, formed by European villain Count Nefaria reappears in the title, composed of Living Laser, Whirlwind and Power Man. He magnifies their powers, but is revealed to be a manipulative ploy to steal their magnified powers in a failed bid to destroy the Avengers. The depowered villains are sent to prison.

Grim Reaper's second Lethal Legion

The Grim Reaper returns in the title West Coast Avengers, leading a third version against the superhero team consisting of Black Talon (Barone), Goliath, Man-Ape, Nekra, and Ultron-12. Grim Reaper has Ultron lead a squadron of robots to spring Goliath from a compound that he is imprisoned in. When Goliath is freed by Man-Ape, the three villains work together to take out the Avengers as Ultron-12 states that he has his own plans for Wonder Man. The three villains escape with an unconscious Henry Pym and Wonder Man. Hawkeye figures out that Grim Reaper is behind this.

The three villains meet up with Grim Reaper. Internal squabbling and personal agendas overtake the villains and they are defeated and scattered.

Porcupine's Lethal Legion

A fourth version appears in the title Marvel Age. They were led by the Porcupine and consisted of Attuma, Batroc the Leaper, Bulldozer, Black Tiger, Kurr'fri of the Saurians, Gorilla-Man (Nagan), Piledriver, Sabretooth, Thundra, Trapster, Unicorn, Whirlwind, and Wrecker. The Lethal Legion tracked down and battle Captain America who is aided by several other Marvel heroes. Their battle with the superheroes was witnessed by the Beyonder. The outcome of the battle was not shown, but it is assumed that the heroes won.

Satannish's Lethal Legion

In the title Avengers West Coast the demon Satannish creates another version using the souls of four infamous historical killers that were found in Mephisto's section of Hell. They have been given powers along with Hangman and the group battle the renamed Avengers West Coast. The group consisted of Axe of Violence (a demonically-enhanced version of Lizzie Borden with an axe replacing one hand), Coldsteel (a demonically-enhanced version of Soviet leader Joseph Stalin, now an 8 ft. giant with superhuman strength), Cyana (a demonically-enhanced version of Lucrezia Borgia with poisoned claws), and Zyklon (a demonically-enhanced version of Nazi official Heinrich Himmler who can belch deadly gas fumes from his mouth). This incarnation eventually lost their powers and their souls were destroyed during the struggle between Mephisto and Satannish.

Grim Reaper's third Lethal Legion

A new version of the Lethal Legion appears during the "Dark Reign" storyline in the three-issue limited series Dark Reign: Lethal Legion. The Grim Reaper (now aided by his brother Wonder Man) recruits villains to oppose criminal mastermind Norman Osborn.

Absorbing Man, Grey Gargoyle, Mister Hyde, and Tiger Shark later reformed the Lethal Legion and end up fighting the Avengers.

Challenger's Lethal Legion

An alien version of the Lethal Legion was formed by Grandmaster to go up against Challenger's Black Order in a contest where Earth is the battlefield and they had to collect the Pyramoids. While the Blood Brothers, Mentacle, and Metal Master II faced off against Black Dwarf, Black Swan, and Supergiant's psychic projection in Rome, Captain Glory, Drall, and Ferene the Other faced off against Corvus Glaive, Ebony Maw, and Proxima Midnight in Cusco, Peru. Both of these confrontations were interrupted by the Avengers.

Each of its members were revealed to have been saved from their approaching deaths in exchange that they partake in his contest against Challenger.

When Challenger reveals his secret player in the form of a resurrected Hulk, most of the Lethal Legion are defeated with Hulk breaking Captain Glory's spine and presumably killing Mentacle.

After the contest is ended by the Avengers, the Lethal Legion regrouped and fled to Knowhere. As they have nowhere to return to after each one's near-death experience, the Lethal Legion decides to stay together and see what they can accomplish.

Count Nefaria's second Lethal Legion

Count Nefaria forms another version of the Lethal Legion which now consists of Grey Gargoyle, Living Laser, and Whirlwind. The group raids a Project Pegasus facility to look for the Catalyst so that Count Nefaria can regain his powers. He revealed to the scientist that mentioned it was relocated that he got a copy of the information from Chameleon as the scientist knows the Catalyst's full potential. Count Nefaria kills the scientist with his abilities so that he won't tell anyone how to stop him. When Whirlwind and Living Laser stated to Count Nefaria that he should be resting, Count Nefaria stated that he needed the exercise.

At Empire State University, Dr. Curt Connors reveals the Catalyst to the crowd when the Lethal Legion attacks. While Grey Gargoyle and Whirlwind attack the people present, Living Laser helps Count Nefaria to operate the Catalyst. Spider-Man shows up and has a hard time fighting them due to the fact that his mind was focused on what a revived Sin-Eater did to Overdrive. Sin-Eater shows up and starts using the same gun he used on Overdrive on Whirlwind and Grey Gargoyle while taking their powers. Immobilizing Spider-Man with Grey Gargoyle's powers, Sin-Eater proceeded to do the same thing to Living Laser and Count Nefaria. All four of them were sent to Ravencroft where they started to act like model inmates. Norah Winters was allowed by Norman Osborn to interview them about Sin-Eater.

As a side-effect of Sin-Eater's suicide upon copying Madame Web's precognition revealed that Kindred was using them, the Lethal Legion regained their sins and are among the villains that went on a rampage.

Membership

Other versions

Heroes Reborn
In the Heroes Reborn reality, the Lethal Legion was formed by Enchantress and consisted of Executioner, Scarlet Witch, Ultron-5, and Wonder Man The Lethal Legion is later betrayed by Loki who takes the Gamma Core's energy for himself.

In other media

Television
The Lethal Legion appears in The Super Hero Squad Show. This version of the group was founded and led by Doctor Doom and consists of the Abomination, MODOK, Mole Man, Fin Fang Foom, Megataur, Tricephalous, Manoo, Klaw, Toad, Melter, the Wrecking Crew, Sabretooth, the Juggernaut, Pyro, Whirlwind, Zzzax, Egghead, the Ringmaster, Paste Pot Pete, Mystique, the Crimson Dynamo, and Batroc the Leaper. Additionally, Songbird worked undercover in the Lethal Legion as Screaming Mimi. Doom forms the group to help him in his quest to collect the Infinity Fractals and rebuild the Infinity Sword. In season two, Molecule Man and Volcana join the Lethal Legion to help break Doom out of the Vault and combat Thanos and the Dark Surfer.

Video games
The Lethal Legion appears in Marvel Super Hero Squad.
The Lethal Legion appears in Lego Marvel Super Heroes. This version of the group is co-led by Doctor Doom, Loki, and Magneto.
The Lethal Legion appears in Marvel's Guardians of the Galaxy. This version of the group is composed of bounty hunters led by Captain Glory and consists of the Blood Brothers.

Footnotes

External links
 Lethal Legion at Marvel.com
 Lethal Legion I at Marvel Wiki
 Lethal Legion II at Marvel Wiki
 Lethal Legion IV at Marvel Wiki
 Lethal Legion V at Marvel Wiki
 Lethal Legion VI at Marvel Wiki
 Lethal Legion I at Marvel Appendix
 Lethal Legion IV at Marvel Appendix
 Lethal Legion V at Marvel Appendix
 

Characters created by John Buscema
Characters created by Kurt Busiek
Characters created by John Byrne (comics)
Characters created by Jim Shooter
Characters created by Roy Thomas
Comics characters introduced in 1970
Comics characters introduced in 1977
Comics characters introduced in 1985
Comics characters introduced in 1993
Comics characters introduced in 2009
Marvel Comics supervillain teams
Cultural depictions of Lizzie Borden
Cultural depictions of Lucrezia Borgia
Cultural depictions of Heinrich Himmler
Cultural depictions of Joseph Stalin